Larry Murphy (born 1972 in Clonroche, County Wexford) is an Irish sportsperson.  He plays hurling with his local club Cloughbawn and was a member of the Wexford senior inter-county team from 1992 until 2004.

References

1972 births
Living people
Cloughbawn hurlers
Wexford inter-county hurlers